Shawn Price (born March 28, 1970) was an American football defensive end in the NFL for the Tampa Bay Buccaneers, Carolina Panthers, Buffalo Bills, and San Diego Chargers.  He played college football at the University of the Pacific, as well as Sierra College, which is located in Rocklin, Ca.  He was selected by the Carolina Panthers in the 1995 NFL Expansion Draft.

1970 births
Living people
People from Van Nuys, Los Angeles
American football defensive ends
Tampa Bay Buccaneers players
Carolina Panthers players
Buffalo Bills players
San Diego Chargers players
Pacific Tigers football players